Herald Island (Ostrov Gerald) is a small, isolated Russian island in the Chukchi Sea,   east of Waring Point, Wrangel Island. It rises in sheer cliffs, making it quite inaccessible, either by ship or by plane. The only bit of accessible shoreline is at its northwestern point, where the cliffs have crumbled into piles of loose rocks and gravel. The island is unglaciated and uninhabited.

Herald Island belongs administratively to the Chukotka Autonomous Okrug of the Russian Federation. Along with Wrangel Island, Herald Island is part of the Wrangel Island Wildlife Preserve, a Russian National Park, since 1976. Cape Dmitrieva on Herald Island, marks the easternmost limits of the nature reserve.

Herald Island is named after survey vessel HMS Herald, from which the island was discovered in 1849.

Geology

Herald Island is composed of sedimentary, metamorphic, and igneous rocks. These rocks are of either Proterozoic or Late Paleozoic age. The bulk of this island consists of a Jurassic granite pluton.

Important Bird Area
Herald Island, along with nearby Wrangel Island, has been designated an Important Bird Area (IBA) by BirdLife International.

Climate

The climate is severe. For most of the year, the region is covered by masses of cold Arctic air with low moisture and dust content.  In summer, warmer and moister Pacific air blows from the south-east.  Dry and strongly warmed air masses periodically blow from Siberia.

The polar day lasts from the middle of May until the 20th of July.  The polar night lasts from the middle of November through the end of January.

Winters are prolonged, and characterized by sustained freezing weather and strong northern winds. The summer is cool, with some frosts and snowfall.

History

Several nations have participated in the discovery and exploration of Herald Island. The island was discovered in 1849 by Sir Henry Kellett, captain of the survey vessel , who was searching for the vanished expedition of Sir John Franklin. Kellett landed on Herald Island and named it after his ship. He also sighted Wrangel Island in the distance.

Herald Island was next visited in 1855, by the  under Lieutenant John Rodgers. An attempt was made to reach Wrangel Island, which was inaccessible because of sea ice. The ill-fated Arctic expedition of George W. De Long in the  entered sea ice near Herald Island in 1879, hoping to reach Wrangel Island and open water near the North Pole. No landing was made, and the ship remained trapped in ice until it was finally crushed. In 1881, the  under Calvin L. Hooper searched Herald Island for message cairns or other signs that might have been left by the Jeannette crew. With the aid of John Muir's mountaineering skills, they were able to reach the top of the island and conduct a thorough search, as well as make geological and biological observations and collect specimens.

No wintering has been recorded on Herald Island, but four crewmen of the ill-fated exploration ship Karluk, flagship of the Canadian Arctic Expedition, reached Herald Island in January 1914 after their ship sank crushed by ice. These four men, Sandy Anderson, Charles Barker, John Brady and Edmund L. Golightly, died there without leaving any record. Their skeletons were found in 1924 by Captain Louis Lane's expedition on the MS Herman. The cause of their death still remains a mystery because there was enough food and ammunition in the place where their remains were found.

In 1916 the Russian ambassador in London issued an official notice to the effect that the Imperial government considered Herald, along with other Arctic islands, integral parts of the Russian Empire. This territorial claim was later maintained by the Soviet Union. In 1926, the Soviet icebreaker Stavropol under Georgy Ushakov approached Herald Island, but was unable to come to shore because of thick sea ice. The icebreaker   made several attempts to reach Herald Island in 1935, while en route to Wrangel Island, but was hindered by thick fog. A landing was finally made on the return trip, when the island was fully surveyed. In 1932, hunting scenes for the film Eskimo were shot at the island.

Some U.S. individuals, including the group State Department Watch, assert American ownership of Herald Island based on the 1855 landing. A 1988 resolution of the Alaska State Senate supported this claim. However, the United States government has never claimed Herald Island, and recognizes it as Russian territory. In 1994, the Alaska State Supreme Court ruled in D. Denardo v. State of Alaska that Herald Island, along with several other islands, is not part of Alaska.

In 2004 Herald Island and neighboring Wrangel Island, along with their surrounding waters, were added to UNESCO's World Heritage List.

See also 
 List of islands of Russia

References

External links 
http://www.wild-russia.org/bioregion1/1-wrangel/1_wrangel.htm Wild Russia - Russian Arctic Reserve] (includes information on the flora and fauna of Herald Island): 
Fujita, K., and D.B. Cook, 1990, The Arctic continental margin of eastern Siberia, in A. Grantz, L. Johnson, and J. F. Sweeney, eds., pp. 289–304, The Arctic Ocean Region. Geology of North America, vol L, Geological Society of America, Boulder, Colorado.
Bureau of European and Eurasian Affairs, 2003, Status of Wrangel and Other Arctic Islands. U.S. Department of State, Washington, D.C. (Fact sheet on Wrangel Island).  
Wrangel Island. The Geographical Journal, Vol. 62, No. 6. (Dec., 1923), pp. 440–444 (requires JSTOR access).
Island in the Sea , L. Zybtsev, at the "Russian Robinson" club (Russian), 1992.
L.V. Gromov.  Осколок древней Берингии (Russian language: "A fragment of ancient Beringia"). Moscow, 1960.
A.I. Mineev.  Остров Врангеля  (Russian language: "Wrangel Island"). Moscow, Leningrad, 1946.
Советская Арктика: моря и острова Северного Ледовитого океана (Russian language: "The Soviet Arctic: the sea and islands of the Arctic Ocean"). Moscow, 1970.

Islands of the Chukchi Sea
Islands of Chukotka Autonomous Okrug
Uninhabited islands of Russia
Important Bird Areas of Russia
Important Bird Areas of Arctic islands